World of Speed was an automotive museum in Wilsonville, Oregon.

History
The museum was founded in April 2015. In 2018, World of Speed hosted more than 51,000 visitors and generated $340,000 in admission and program fees. The museum closed in 2020, during the COVID-19 pandemic.

See also

 List of automotive museums

References

External links
 

2015 establishments in Oregon
2020 disestablishments in Oregon
Automobile museums in Oregon
Defunct museums in Oregon
Museums established in 2015
Wilsonville, Oregon